Batman, in manga, can refer to many different Batman manga series:

Batman: Child of Dreams, a Batman manga series by Kia Asamiya
Batman: Death Mask, a Batman manga series by Yoshinori Natsume
Bat-Manga!: The Secret History of Batman in Japan, a 1960s Batman manga by Jiro Kuwata

See also
Batman (disambiguation)